The Men's Individual Pursuit was one of the 10 men's events at the 2010 UCI Track Cycling World Championships, held in Ballerup, Denmark on 25 March 2010.

Twenty-seven cyclists from 20 countries participated in the contest. After the qualification, the two fastest riders advanced to the final and the 3rd- and 4th-best riders raced for the bronze medal.

The qualification took place on 25 March and the finals later the same day.

World record

Qualifying

Finals

References

Qualifying Results
Finals Results

Men's individual pursuit
UCI Track Cycling World Championships – Men's individual pursuit